Avoriaz is a French mountain resort in the heart of the Portes du Soleil. It is located in the territory of the commune of Morzine. It is easily accessible from either Thonon at Lake Geneva or Cluses station on the A40 motorway between Geneva and Chamonix. Either way one follows the D902, Route des Grandes Alpes, to Morzine and then the D338 running from Morzine to Avoriaz. Snow chains are often necessary.
Avoriaz is built on a shelf high above the town of Morzine, which is among the pioneering towns of skiing with its first lifts dating back to the early 1930s. 
Today Avoriaz is one of the major French ski destinations catering for all standards of  skiing and ranks among the top snowboarding destinations of the world. Apart from snow-based pursuits, Avoriaz is also a centre for trekking, golf, VTT (mountain biking) and other outdoor activities during the summer.  
Cars are forbidden in Avoriaz. The resort is designed to be fully skiable. Other transport around the resort includes horse-drawn sleighs and snowcats during winter.

One of the principal owners of Avoriaz is the tourism and real estate development company Pierre & Vacances, whose founder, Gerard Bremont, took an active part in building the station.

Resort history 

Around 1965, former French downhill olympic champion Jean Vuarnet was given the task of developing the skiing of Morzine and came up with the first plan of a new skiing area on the north side of the Hauts Fort mountain and the Fornet-bowl. Later, lift connections were made to the east and south, creating a vast linked skiing area covering France and Switzerland. Avoriaz as a resort is the brainchild of Gerard Bremont, the son of a leading French industrialist whom Jean Vuarnet asked to invest in the project. Gerard Bremont - at the time a notable member of the French jetset - engaged 3 newly educated and highly talented young architects to design the resort and within a few years Avoriaz and especially the Hotel Dromont and its restaurant and Discothèque was proclaimed the "Saint Tropez de Neige" - the centre of jet-set skiing. At a later stage other former elite skiers such as Isabelle Mir and Annie Famose got involved - the latter today running the famous ski-kindergarten. The two of them jointly giving name to one of the leading ski- and fashion shops, The Mirfamose. Today Avoriaz is no longer a fashionable destination as such but more of a mainstream winter-resort with predominantly self-catering guests staying under more modest conditions. For the Winter 2011/12 ski season Avoriaz has undergone many changes including the development of a brand new area with 8 buildings housing a total of 450 ski apartments including L'Amara, Crozats and L'Electra residences.

Surrounding pistes

Avoriaz is a resort on the main circuit of one of the largest skiing areas in the world, Les Portes du Soleil, named after a pass between France and Switzerland. The Avoriaz part of the skiing area consists of about 130 km of piste. The entire Portes du Soleil offers between 650 and 700 km of piste – nearly all of it linked by more than 200 lifts. The total lift capacity is close to 250,000 persons per hour, making it one of the two largest linked lift networks in the world alongside Les Trois Vallées (Les Portes du Soleil having slightly more lifts but with slightly less capacity per hour). Avoriaz is directly linked to Swiss resort Les Crosets and French resorts Chatel and Morzine. The connection between Avoriaz, and specifically the Lindaret bowl and Chatel has recently been upgraded to a 6-person chair, replacing an old chair and opening up the connection for more skiers and snowboarders. Plans are underway to increase the connections between Morzine and Avoriaz, with the new Prodain lift opened at the end of the 2012–2013 season and an extension down the valley into the centre of Morzine planned.

The Avoriaz pistes are divided in 4 sectors: The Lindaret, Haut-Forts, Fornet and Super Morzine. The latter being mainly connection to Morzine and heavily used by ski-schools and beginners. 
The Lindaret is a beautiful valley with a number of red and blue runs plus a single black. It also has The Stash - a conceptual snowpark developed by Burton and based on ecological principles. It is the only one of its kind in France. There are a number of restaurants and a small village at the bottom of the valley. 
The Fornet area is a large bowl with basically skiing everywhere between huge rocks and crevasses. From one of the ridges around the Fornet bowl one can test the famous La Chavanette - also known as The Swiss Wall, one of the steepest pistes in Europe - it is not part of the Avoriaz system but belongs to neighbouring Swiss resort Les Crosets.  
Haut-Forts is the most demanding area with a number of black runs starting at 2,400 and ending at 1,100 metres, some of which are for experts only. The world cup piste - although rated black - is pretty easy though. This area is also ideal for off-piste although caution is advised since this is an area with frequent avalanches. From the Haut-Forts top-station it is possible to ski directly back to Avoriaz by red or blue slopes.

Architecture
Avoriaz is unique amongst the 1960s purpose built ski resorts. Gerard Bremont hired young architects Jacques Labro, Jean-Jacques Orzoni and Jean-Marc Roques to design the resort. Loosely inspired by some of the ideas of famous Swiss architect Le Corbusier, they went on to design a unique resort - high rise buildings (12- 16 floors) with acute angles and a close similarity to the mountains that surrounded them - the result being that seen from afar Avoriaz blends in very well with the mountains. The Dromonts hotel was designed by Labro and was the first building finished in March 1966. The buildings are almost entirely covered in red cedar wood. The 3 original architects of Avoriaz have all won awards for their work such as the Académie des Beaux Arts, the Equerre d'Argent and silver medal from the Architectural Académie.

Downhill mountain biking 

Portes du Soleil is among the top downhill mountain biking stations in Europe and by far the largest in France. Several of the more testing routes embark from Avoriaz, and the local branch of the French Ski-School (ESF), change into a downhill biking school and bike rental centre each year during July and August. A number of chairlifts operate during the summer to ensure lift capacity for the rapidly rising number of downhill mountain bikers. The biking of Avoriaz is concentrated in the Lindaret Valley with connections further on towards Châtel and Les Crosets. There is a large number of tracks around Morzine and Les Gets as well.

Aquariaz 
This water park with over 1500 tropical plants and 183 tropical trees opened in July 2012, offering an aqua leisure experience in tropical surroundings.

Avoriaz International Fantastic Film Festival 

For twenty years, from 1973 to 1993, Avoriaz was host to the Avoriaz International Fantastic Film Festival (French: Festival international du film fantastique d'Avoriaz)—a film festival mainly devoted to science fiction and horror movies. Steven Spielberg's debut, Duel, was the first prizewinner of the festival. Other winners include Peter Jackson, David Cronenberg and David Lynch (twice). There is a quite interesting series of posters covering the 20 festivals. The posters were originally for sale in different sizes, including postcards, but are hard to find today. The posters are on permanent display at the restaurant "Le Bistro" in the resort-centre.

The event was succeeded by the similar Festival International du Film Fantastique de Gérardmer.

Tour de France 

Avoriaz and its "mothertown" Morzine have been frequent hosts to the Tour de France. Avoriaz has hosted a stage finish of the Tour de France 6 times. First time was in 1975 with Spanish Vicente López Carril the winner. In 1994 Piotr Ugrumov won a short mountain time trial between Morzine and Avoriaz. In 2010 Avoriaz was once again host of a Tour de France finish - the first mountain stage of the race won by Andy Schleck. Furthermore, Morzine in the valley below Avoriaz has hosted stage finishes on a number of occasions. Among others the now infamous stage win of American Floyd Landis in 2006 following which he was tested for and convicted of doping.

See also
 List of highest paved roads in Europe
 List of mountain passes

References

External links

Official tourist information site
Official Virtual Tour of Avoriaz
2010 Tour de France preview for Stage 8 at Avoriaz

Ski stations in France
Tourist attractions in Haute-Savoie